Prince Edward was a  federal electoral district in Ontario, Canada, that was represented in the House of Commons of Canada from 1867 to 1904. It was created by the British North America Act of 1867, and consisted of the County of Prince Edward.

The electoral district was abolished in 1924 when it was merged into Prince Edward—Lennox riding.

Electoral history

|- 
  
|Liberal
|Walter ROSS
|align="right"| 1,779   
  
|Conservative
|James Simeon MCCUAIG
|align="right"| 942    

|- 
  
|Liberal
|Walter ROSS
|align="right"| 1,759   
  
|Conservative
|James Simeon MCCUAIG
|align="right"| 1,625    

|- 
  
|Liberal
|Walter ROSS
|align="right"|  1,775   
  
|Conservative
|James Simeon   MCCUAIG
|align="right"| 1,649    

|- 
  
|Conservative
|James Simeon MCCUAIG
|align="right"| 1,991    
  
|Liberal
|John M. PLATT
|align="right"| 1,701   

|- 
  
|Liberal
|John M. PLATT
|align="right"| 1,944   
  
|Conservative
|James Simeon MCCUAIG
|align="right"| 1,925    

|- 
  
|Liberal
|John M. PLATT
|align="right"| 2,222   
 
|Unknown
|Robert  CLAPP
|align="right"|2,151    

By-election: On election being declared void:

|- 
  
|Liberal
|John M. PLATT
|align="right"| 2,198   
 
|Unknown
|Robert  CLAPP
|align="right"| 1,971   

|- 
  
|Conservative
|Archibald Campbell MILLER
|align="right"| 2,264    
  
|Liberal
|John M. PLATT
|align="right"| 2,225   

By-election: On election being declared void:

|- 
  
|Conservative
|Archibald Campbell  MILLER
|align="right"| acclaimed    

|- 
 
|Patrons of Industry
|Wm. Varney PETTET
|align="right"|2,188    
  
|Conservative
|W. BOULTER
|align="right"|1,967    

|- 
  
|Conservative
|George Oscar ALCORN
|align="right"|2,148    
  
|Liberal
|William V.  PETTET
|align="right"| 2,080   

|- 
  
|Conservative
|George Oscar    ALCORN
|align="right"|  2,253    
  
|Liberal
|  ROSE
|align="right"| 2,107   

|- 
  
|Liberal
|Morley CURRIE
|align="right"|  2,341   
  
|Conservative
|George Oscar ALCORN
|align="right"| 2,204    

|- 
  
|Conservative
|Bernard Rickart HEPBURN
|align="right"|2,304    
  
|Liberal
|Morley CURRIE
|align="right"|2,024   

|- 
  
|Government
|William Bernard Rickart  HEPBURN
|align="right"| 3,231   
  
|Opposition
|Herbert HORSEY
|align="right"| 1,755   

|- 
  
|Conservative
|John  HUBBS
|align="right"|  3,839    

  
|Liberal
|Herbert HORSEY
|align="right"|2,357

See also 

 List of Canadian federal electoral districts
 Past Canadian electoral districts

External links 

 Website of the Parliament of Canada

Former federal electoral districts of Ontario